The Ust Pinega Formation is a geological formation exposed along the banks of the Onega River in Arkhangelsk Oblast, northwestern Russia.

It is famed for the vast quantities of fossils of Ediacara biota preserved in its ash beds.

References

Geology of European Russia
Geologic formations of Russia
Ediacaran Europe
Geography of Arkhangelsk Oblast